Martha Kelly is an American stand-up comedian and actress from Los Angeles, California, best known for co-starring in the FX comedy series Baskets. In 2022, Kelly was nominated for the Primetime Emmy Award for Outstanding Guest Actress in a Drama Series for her role as the drug dealer Laurie on Euphoria.

Career
She has been featured on Late Night with Conan O'Brien, Comedy Central's The Half Hour and Premium Blend, NBC's Last Comic Standing, and The Late Late Show with Craig Ferguson. 
 
At age 25, Kelly experimented with stand-up comedy at the Laugh Factory in her native Los Angeles. Her material and confidence slowly developed over a five-year period.

Kelly first surfaced on comedy stages in Austin, Texas with HBO's Aspen Comedy Festival auditions in the fall of 1999, followed by winning Capital City Comedy Club's annual "Funniest Person in Austin" contest in April 2000.  Kelly was the winner of Comedy Central's 2002 Laugh Riots national comedy competition and was one of the New Faces in the Just for Laughs comedy festival that same year. 
 
After many years of performing stand-up, Kelly made her acting debut in January 2016 after long-time friend Zach Galifianakis asked her to co-star in his FX comedy series Baskets. She co-stars as Martha, an insurance adjuster and friend of Chip Baskets (played by Galifianakis).

In 2022, Kelly was nominated for an Emmy for her guest role as a drug dealer in the HBO series Euphoria.

Filmography

Film

Television

References

External links
 
 Austin Chronicle Interview, May 2000

American women comedians
Living people
1968 births
21st-century American comedians
21st-century American women